Ivan Dal Santo (born 12 January 1972) is a retired footballer from Switzerland who played as a defender.

Career
Dal Santo has played 293 games in Super League and over 190 games in Challenge League.

Coaching career
In the 2009/10 season, he worked as a playing manager for FC Dietikon and later for FC Oerlikon Polizei in the 2010/11 season. From July 2011 to January 2014 he was the manager of Zug 94.

In June 2014, he was hired by Rapperswil-Jona as manager of the U15's. In the summer 2016, he took charge of FC Luzern's U18 squad. From the summer 2018, he was promoted to manager for the U21's / reserve team.

From the end of May 2019 until January 2021, he was the manager for the women's team of FC Zürich.

External links
football.ch profile  

Personal Website

References

1972 births
Living people
Swiss men's footballers
Swiss people of Italian descent
FC Luzern players
FC Zürich players
FC Winterthur players
Neuchâtel Xamax FCS players
FC Wohlen players
FC St. Gallen players
Swiss Super League players
SC Young Fellows Juventus players
Association football defenders